Yang Shaohui (born 9 July 1992) is a Chinese long-distance runner. In 2019, he competed in the men's marathon at the 2019 World Athletics Championships held in Doha, Qatar. He finished in 20th place.

References

External links 
 

Living people
1992 births
Place of birth missing (living people)
Chinese male long-distance runners
Chinese male marathon runners
World Athletics Championships athletes for China
Athletes (track and field) at the 2020 Summer Olympics
Olympic athletes of China
Olympic male marathon runners
20th-century Chinese people
21st-century Chinese people